Lepidochrysops jefferyi, the Jeffery's blue, is a species of butterfly in the family Lycaenidae. It is endemic to South Africa, where it known from grassland on the hills above Ulundi, Fairview and the Sheba Mines in Mpumalanga.

The wingspan is 38–44 mm for males and 42–46 mm for females. Adults are on wing from October to November. There is one generation per year.

The larvae feed on Becium grandiflorum.

References

Lepidochrysops
Butterflies described in 1909
Endemic butterflies of South Africa
Taxonomy articles created by Polbot